Clubul Sportiv Municipal Volei Alba Blaj, commonly known as CSM Volei Alba Blaj, is a professional women's volleyball club based in Blaj, Transylvania, Romania, that competes in the CEV Cup.

History   
In 2018, Alba reached the CEV Champions League Final Four for the first time in their history.

On 5 May 2018, they achieved a historic success for Romania by advancing to the final with 3-1 victory over Galatasaray SK Istanbul in Bucharest. In its first-ever appearance in a continental championship match, Blaj lost in Sunday's grand final at Polyvalent Hall. Vakıfbank Istanbul — Champions League holders in 2017 and runners-up in 2016 — topped Alba 25-17, 25-11, 25-17.

Also in 2018, the Blaj City Council and the Alba County Council decided together to support the construction of a new, 2000-seat arena. The new arena is expected to be ready for 2020.

Honours

Domestic 
 Divizia A1 
 Winners (6): 2015, 2016, 2017, 2019, 2020, 2022

 Cupa României 
 Winners (4): 2017, 2019, 2021, 2022

 Supercupa României 
 Winners (1): 2021

European 
 CEV Champions League 
 Runners-Up (1): 2018

  CEV Cup
 Runners-Up (1): 2019

  CEV Challenge Cup
 Runners-Up (1): 2021

European Records
On 6 May 2018, in the final game of the 2018 Champions League, CSM Volei Alba Blaj attained the record of the worst score in a volleyball European cup final since the Rally Point System was adopted, with only 45 points: VakifBank Istanbul – CSM Volei Alba Blaj 3–0 (25-17, 25-11, 25-17).

On 19 March 2019, in the home game of the final match of the 2019 CEV Cup, CSM Volei Alba Blaj attained the record of the worst score in a CEV Cup final (women's) since the Rally Point System was adopted, with only 49 points. CSM Volei Alba Blaj – Unet e-work Busto Arsizio 0–3 (19-25, 16-25, 14-25).

On 17 March 2021, in the home game of the final match of the 2021 Challenge Cup, CSM Volei Alba Blaj attained the record of the worst score in a Challenge Cup final since the Rally Point System was adopted, with only 46 points. CSM Volei Alba Blaj – System9 Yesilyurt 0–3 (12-25, 18-25, 16-25). This record was equaled one week later, on 24 March 2021, in the away game: System9 Yesilyurt – CSM Volei Alba Blaj: 3–0 (25-17, 25-17, 25-12).

Team

Current squad
Squad for the 2020-21 season 
 
  Ioana Baciu
  Ramona Rus
  Ștefania Cheluță
  Francesca Ioana Alupei
  Silvija Popović
  Ana Antonijević
  Maja Aleksić
  Bojana Čelić-Marković
  Bojana Milenković
  Aleksandra Spasenić
  Jovana Kocić
  Irina Malkova
  Réka Bleicher

Selected former players  
  Adina Salaoru
  Roxana Bacșiș
  Ana Cleger
  Samara Almeida
  Lena Möllers
  Tijana Malešević
  Nataša Krsmanović
  Jovana Vesović 
  Ana Antonijević
  Ana Lazarević 
  Selime İlyasoğlu

See also
 Romania women's national volleyball team

References

External links
CEV profile
Voleiromania profile

Romanian volleyball clubs
Blaj
2011 establishments in Romania
Volleyball clubs established in 2011